Nepal competed at the 1980 Summer Olympics in Moscow, USSR.

Results by event

Athletics
Men's 100 metres
 Raghuraj Onta
 Heat — 11.61 (→ did not advance)

Men's 5,000 metres
Laxman Basnet
 Heat — 16:11.7 (→ did not advance)

Men's 10,000 metres
Narbahadur Dahal
 Heat — 31:19.8 (→ did not advance)

Men's Marathon
 Baikuntha Manandhar
 Final — 2:23:51 (→ 37th place)

 Mukundahari Shrestha
 Final — 2:38:52 (→ 45th place)

Boxing
Men's Flyweight (51 kg)
 Rabiraj Thapa
 First Round — Bye
 Second Round — Lost to János Váradi (Hungary) after referee stopped contest in first round

Men's Bantamweight (54 kg)
 Pushkardhoj Shahi
 First Round — Bye
 Second Round — Lost to Ali ben Maghenia (France) walk-over

Men's Featherweight (57 kg)
 Narendra Poma
 First Round — Bye
 Second Round — Lost to Sidnei Dalrovere (Brazil) after referee stopped contest in first round

Men's Light-Welterweight (63,5 kg)
 Bishnu Malakar
 First Round — Lost to Ryu Bun-Hwa (North Korea) after referee stopped contest in first round

References
Official Olympic Reports

Nations at the 1980 Summer Olympics
1980
1980 in Nepal